Henrik Munkeby Nørstebø (born 29 July 1986 in Trondheim, Norway) is a Norwegian trombonist.

Biography 
Henrik Munkeby Nørstebø - acoustic and amplified trombone.

Born (1986) in Trondheim, Norway, Nørstebø chose the trombone and began playing in the local marching band at the age of seven. Twenty some years later, he is still riding the ups and downs of an instrumental long term relationship, using the trombone's crudeness as a creative challenge and vehicle to unearth its seemingly limitless possibilities. He has done heavy research into both the boisterous and brassy side of the instrument, as well as its counterpoint in microscopic and ‘electronic’ sound possibilities. Through a technical distillation process, he has developed a vast personal sound vocabulary, spanning from pure long tones to noise and the almost inaudible. Seeking a balance between intuitive and precisely constructed material, he has slowly been moving towards a more holistic sound practice, combining the power of brass tubes with an external approach including sound sources like half-clarinet and various noise generators.

Nørstebø started his solo trajectory in 2007, and has since undergone solo tours in Europe, USA and Australia. His first record ("Solo", 2011) contained widely different stream of consciousness improvisations, while his second solo release (“Melting into foreground”, 2015) was more of a compositional work, focusing on the inner energy of sound and the tension between empty and filled spaces. In his current set up, Nørstebø is utilizing heavy close amplification alongside acoustic elements, producing a multi-faceted body of sound. He is currently working on his third solo release.

His working projects include: the amplified voice and trombone duo Beam Splitter with Audrey Chen, a duo with Austrian sound artist Daniel Lercher, the longstanding all-in improvising unit Lana trio, a duo with experimental turntablist JD Zazie and the acoustic trios Whirl (with Adrian Myhr and Tobias Delius) and Nørstebø/Strid/de Heney (with Nina de Heney and Raymond Strid).

He has toured actively since 2010, and played at clubs and festivals all over Europe, as well as in Russia, Japan, Taiwan, New Zealand, Australia, USA, Brazil and Argentina. Festival performances include: Huddersfield contemporary music festival (UK), A l'arme! festival (Berlin/DE), Gogolfest (Kiev/UA), Fete quaqua (London/UK), Nattjazz (Bergen/NO), Jazzfest Berlin (DE), Kongsberg jazzfestival (NO), Festival Akouphene (Geneva/CH), Angelica festival (Bologna/IT), V:NM festival (Graz/AT), Joyful noise (Biel/CH), Gothenburg art sounds (SE), SoundOut (Canberra/AU) and Ultima contemporary music festival (Oslo, NO).

Nørstebø is also an experienced ensemble player, having performed live and on recordings stretching from the fairest pop to the strangest noise. He is a founding member of Oslo based new music ensemble "Aksiom", and has released three records with the 12-piece freejazzpop-band "Skadedyr". He has also been seen in groups like Johan Lindvall's "Torg" (Jazzland), Mette Henriette "Ø" (ECM), Trondheim jazz orchestra & Kristoffer Lo, Dan Peter Sundland elevenette and Nate Wooley's "Seven storey mountain V".

Educated in improvised music and jazz from the music academies in Gothenburg (BA) and Oslo (MA), he is based in Norway and Berlin.

”On both pieces, Nørstebø keeps his compositional structures clear through a balanced use of filled and empty space. The silences he allows between passages of sound tend to act as boundaries separating sections into disjunctive events defined by dramatic changes in timbre as well as in organization and dynamics. And despite his deliberate distorting and dismantling of the trombone’s conventional voice, he allows a fundamental warmth to pervade both performances.”
- Avant music news, Daniel Barbiero (USA) />

Discography

Solo album 
 2011: SOLO (Creative Sources)
 2015: Melting Into Foreground (SOFA)

Collaborations 
With 'As Deafness Increases'
 2013: As Deafness Increases (Va Fongool)

With 'Lana Trio' including Andreas Wildhagen and Kjetil Jerve
 2013: Lana trio (Va Fongool)
 2014: Live In Japan (Va Fongool)

With 'Skadedyr'
 2013: Kongekrabbe (Hubro)
 2016: Culturen (Hubro)

With Rasmus Borg
 2014: 120112 (Edition Wandelweiser Records)

With Daniel Lercher
 2014: TH_X (Chmafu Nocords)

With Mette Henriette's 'Ø'
 2015: Mette Henriette (ECM Records)

With 'Torg'
 2015: Kost/Elak/Gnäll (Jazzland Recordings)

With the trio 'Whirl' including Adrian Myhr and Tobias Delius
 2015: Revolving Rapidly Around An Axis (dEN Records)

With Raymond Strid and Nina de Heney
 2015: Oslo Wien (Va Fongool)

References

External links 
 

21st-century Norwegian trombonists
Norwegian jazz trombonists
Male trombonists
ECM Records artists
Musicians from Trondheim
1986 births
Living people
21st-century trombonists
21st-century Norwegian male musicians
Male jazz musicians